Posh and Becks is a widely used nickname for the British celebrity supercouple Victoria Beckham (née Adams, "Posh Spice" of the Spice Girls) and David Beckham (a footballer and former England captain). Posh & Becks is also the title of a book about the couple by Andrew Morton.

As a phrase
"Posh and Becks" as a phrase was included in the Collins Concise English Dictionary in 2001. The term "Posh and Becks" is commonly used by newspapers and other media, especially in headlines, and has become an expression that is widely used and recognised within popular culture in the United Kingdom.

The term "Posh and Becks" has also found its way into rhyming slang, referring to "sex".

As a couple
Posh and Becks started dating in 1997, which led to the use of the term by the popular media. Their celebrity wedding took place on 4 July 1999, and the home in Hertfordshire, England, that they bought shortly afterwards has been nicknamed by the media as "Beckingham Palace" (a portmanteau of Buckingham Palace and the name Beckham).

The couple have recently turned their attention to the US and are the subject of a 2007 eponymous joint biography Posh & Becks.

Posh and Becks have four children: sons Brooklyn Joseph Beckham, Romeo James Beckham, and Cruz David Beckham; and daughter Harper Seven Beckham. Their choice of children's names was the butt of an award-winning joke by Canadian comedian Stewart Francis at the 2012 Edinburgh Fringe.

See also
Brangelina

References

British slang
English culture
Married couples
Victoria Beckham
David Beckham